Orlov-Denisov was the name of noble family of Don Cossacks origin. Count's of Russian Empire since 1801. In honour of Vasily Orlov-Denisov's grandfather Fedor Petrovich Denisov he added his surname to his own, becoming Orlov-Denisov on 26 April 1801.

Notable members 

 Vasily Petrovich Orlov (1745–1801), was a Russian Full General of Cavalry. Hero of Russo-Turkish Wars of (1768–1774) and (1787–1792). Ataman of the Don Cossacks, received orders to command the Indian March of Paul in January 1801.
 Vasily Orlov-Denisov  (1775–1843), was a son of Vasily Petrovich Orlov, a Don Cossacks General. Shikhany manor was passed from the wife of Vasily Orlov-Denisov baroness Maria Vassilieva (1784–1829).

External links 
 Shumkov, A.A., Ryklis, I.G. List of noble families of the Don Cossacks in alphabetical order. VIRD Publ House, Sankt-Peterburg. 2000, 

Don Cossacks noble families
Russian noble families